USS St. Lo (AVG/ACV/CVE–63) was a  of the United States Navy during World War II. On 25 October 1944, St. Lo became the first major warship to sink as the result of a kamikaze attack. The attack occurred during the Battle off Samar, part of the larger Battle of Leyte Gulf.

Construction
St. Lo was laid down as Chapin Bay on 23 January 1943, under a Maritime Commission (MARCOM) contract, MC hull 1100; renamed Midway on 3 April 1943; launched on 17 August 1943; sponsored by Mrs Howard Nixon Coulter, commissioned on 23 October 1943 with Captain Francis J. McKenna in command.

Service history
Midway left Astoria, Oregon on 13 November 1943. She went dry docking on 10 April 1944. After shakedown on the west coast and two voyages to Pearl Harbor and one to Australia, carrying replacement aircraft, Midway, with Composite Squadron 65 (VC-65) embarked, joined Rear Admiral Gerald F. Bogan's Carrier Support Group 1 in June, for the Mariana Islands. She provided air cover for the transports and participated in airstrikes on Saipan  VC-65's FM-2 Wildcats claimed to have shot down four and damaged one other Japanese aircraft during combat air patrol operations there.

On 13 July, she sailed for Eniwetok, for replenishment before joining the attack on Tinian, on 23 July. Furnishing air support for ground forces on the island and maintaining an anti-submarine patrol, Midway operated off Tinian, until she again headed out for supplies on 28 July.

Midway remained at anchor in Eniwetok Atoll, until she got under way on 9 August, for Seeadler Harbor, at Manus, Admiralty Islands, arriving on 13 August.

On 13 September, she sortied with Task Force 77 (TF 77) for the invasion of Morotai. Launching her first aircraft to support the landings on 15 September.  She continued to assist allied troops ashore and provide cover for the transports through 22 September.

After a refueling period, Midway resumed air operations in the Palaus until returning to Seeadler Harbor on 3 October. There, word arrived that the escort carrier had been renamed St. Lo, 10 October, to free the name Midway for a new attack carrier and to commemorate the Battle of Saint-Lô, on 18 July 1944.

Battle off Samar

St. Lo departed Seeadler Harbor on 12 October, to participate in the liberation of Leyte. Ordered to provide air coverage and close air support during the bombardment and amphibious landings, she arrived off Leyte on 18 October. She launched airstrikes in support of invasion operations at Tacloban, on the northeast coast of Leyte. Operating with Rear Admiral Clifton Sprague's escort carrier unit, "Taffy 3" (TU 77.4.3), which consisted of six escort carriers and a screen of three destroyers and four destroyer escorts, St. Lo steamed off the east coasts of Leyte and Samar and her aircraft sortied from 18 to 24 October, attacking enemy installations and airfields on Leyte and Samar islands.

At the same time, lookouts on St. Lo spotted the characteristic pagoda-like superstructures of Japanese battleships on the horizon. Rear Admiral Sprague ordered Taffy 3 to turn south at flank speed. Vice Admiral Takeo Kurita's force closed and by about 06:58 opened fire on the slow, outnumbered and outgunned ships of Taffy 3.

St. Lo and the other five escort carriers dodged in and out of rain squalls and managed to launch all available fighter and torpedo aircraft with whatever armament they had available. Pilots were ordered, "to attack the Japanese task force and proceed to Tacloban airstrip, Leyte, to rearm and refuel" as the carriers managed to dodge salvos from enemy cruisers and battleships.

By 08:00, the enemy cruisers, approaching from St. Los port quarter, had closed to within . St. Lo responded with fire from her single  gun, claiming three hits on a Tone-class cruiser.

Many salvos straddled the ship, landed close aboard, or passed directly overhead. Throughout the battle, the carriers and their escorts used smoke screens that Admiral Sprague credited with degrading Japanese gun accuracy. More effective were the attacks by the destroyers and destroyer escorts against the Japanese ships. All the while, Kurita's force was under attack by Taffy 3 aircraft and aircraft from the two other U.S. carrier units to the south.

Under attack from the air and fire from American destroyers and destroyer escorts, the enemy cruisers broke off the action and turned north at 09:20. The torpedoes had nearly run out of fuel when they finally approached the escort carriers, broaching the surface.

Kamikaze

At 10:50, the task unit came under a concentrated air attack by the Shikishima Special Attack Unit. During the forty-minute engagement with enemy kamikazes, all the escort carriers except  were damaged.  One Mitsubishi A6M2 Zero—perhaps flown by Lieutenant Yukio Seki—crashed into the flight deck of St. Lo at 10:51. Seki was originally aiming to strike the carrier White Plains but damage from anti-aircraft fire made him change course to the St. Lo. Its bomb penetrated the flight deck and exploded on the port side of the hangar deck, where aircraft were in the process of being refueled and rearmed. A gasoline fire erupted, followed by secondary explosions, including detonations of the ship's torpedo and bomb magazine. St. Lo was engulfed in flame and sank 30 minutes later.

Of the 889 men aboard, 113 were killed or missing and approximately 30 others died of their wounds.

The wreck is located near .

Awards

 Presidential Unit Citation
 American Campaign Medal
 Asiatic-Pacific Medal with 4 awards
 World War II Victory Medal
 Philippine Presidential Unit Citation
 Philippine Liberation Medal

Wreck
The wreck of St. Lo was found by RV Petrel on 14 May 2019 and surveyed on 25 May 2019. The main wreck sits upright in 4,736 meters (15,538 feet) of water, on the edge of the Philippine Trench.

See also
List of U.S. Navy losses in World War II

References

Bibliography

External links

 USS Saint Lo CVE-63 history site

Casablanca-class escort carriers
World War II escort aircraft carriers of the United States
Ships built in Vancouver, Washington
1943 ships
World War II shipwrecks in the Philippine Sea
Ships sunk by kamikaze attack
Aircraft carriers sunk by aircraft
Maritime incidents in October 1944
Shipwreck discoveries by Paul Allen
2019 archaeological discoveries
S4-S2-BB3 ships
Ships sunk by aircraft during the Battle of Leyte Gulf
Naval magazine explosions